Hoggard, Prouse and Gummer was an architectural firm that started in 1913 in Wellington, New Zealand. The partners were John Hoggard, William Prouse and William Henry Gummer. Two notable building designed by the firm are the New Zealand Insurance building, later known as the Guardian Trust Building, in Auckland on Queen Street, and the State Fire Insurance Building, Wellington.

References

Architecture firms of New Zealand
Companies based in Wellington
New Zealand companies established in 1913
Design companies established in 1913